Poposauridae is a family of large  carnivorous archosaurs which lived alongside dinosaurs during the Late Triassic. Poposaurids are known from fossil remains from North and South America. While originally believed to be theropod dinosaurs (they mirrored the theropods in a  number of respects, such as features of the skull and bipedal locomotion), cladistic analysis has shown them to be more closely related to crocodiles.

An early cladistic analysis of crocodylotarsan archosaurs included Poposaurus, Postosuchus, Teratosaurus, and Bromsgroveia within Poposauridae. However, later studies found Teratosaurus to be a rauisuchid. All recent phylogenetic analyses place Postosuchus either as a rauisuchid  or a prestosuchid.

Genera

References

Further reading
 Galton, P. M., 1985, The poposaurid thecodontian Teratosaurus suevicus von Meyer, plus referred specimens mostly based on prosauropod dinosaurs. Stuttgarter Beitrage zur Naturkunde, B 116: 1-29.

External links
 Palaeos
 Taxon Search
 Mikko's Phylogeny Archive
 Re: Postosuchus/Rauisuchus - Dinosaur Mailing List archives

Late Triassic first appearances
Late Triassic extinctions
Prehistoric reptile families